MCW may mean:

Higher education
Master of Creative Writing - a postgraduate education degree offered in New Zealand and Australia, similar to a Master of Fine Arts in creative writing in the United States
Medical College of Wisconsin, private medical school in Milwaukee, Wisconsin

Sports
 Maryland Championship Wrestling - a professional wrestling promotion based in Maryland
 Melbourne City Wrestling - a professional wrestling promotion based in Melbourne
 Memphis Championship Wrestling - a professional wrestling promotion based in Memphis
 Michael Carter-Williams, American professional basketball player 
 Micro Championship Wrestling - a Midget wrestling promotion based in St. Petersburg, Florida

Other
Mason City Municipal Airport in Mason City, Iowa (IATA Code: MCW)
Metro Cammell Weymann, former United Kingdom bus manufacturer
Modulated continuous wave, method for transmitting continuous wave information over other types of radio emissions
Mountain Cold Weather, mountain warfare training at Norwich University in Vermont